Lullaby Baxter (born Angelina Teresa Iapaolo in 1970 in Scarborough, Ontario) is a Canadian jazz singer. Her first album, Capable Egg, was released in 2000 by Atlantic Records, and her 2006 album Garden Cities of To-morrow was released by Boompa Records.

The Village Voice has called her "cerebrally seductive" and compared her to Peggy Lee, while Pitchfork Media has compared her to Ella Fitzgerald.

She is the sister-in-law of jazz musician Steve Kirby.

References

1970 births
Living people
Canadian women jazz singers
Musicians from Toronto
People from Scarborough, Toronto
University of Calgary alumni
21st-century Canadian women singers